is an otokonoko romance manga series created by . It was originally serialized by Ichijinsha in their magazine Waai! from April 24, 2010 to November 25, 2013, and has since also been collected in three tankōbon volumes. Together with Sazanami Cherry, it was the first manga published under the Waai! Comics imprint.

The story follows Shuu Kaidou, who has to transfer to an all-male school that requires its students to take turns wearing women's clothing, a rule in place to promote positive relationships between men and women. He is confused by this but is helped by the cross-dressing coordination committee member Tsubaki Yaezaki. The series was written with themes of male gay romance, change, and male femininity, with a focus on how the characters are affected by dressing like women. It was well received, considered to stand out both among the manga published in Waai! and among cross-dressing manga more broadly.

Premise
Reversible! is an otokonoko romance manga set in St. Stokesia Academy, a Japanese all-male school which mandates that its students – half of them at a time – take turns wearing women's clothing, alternating every week. This rule is in place to encourage positive relationships between men and women despite the all-male environment. Shuu Kaidou, a student at another school, is bullied by three women who frame him for a crime, and as a result he has to transfer to St. Stokesia. He is both confused by and unhappy with the mandated cross-dressing but gets help from the experienced cross-dresser Tsubaki Yaezaki, a student on the school's cross-dressing coordination committee. Tsubaki gradually introduces Shuu to wearing feminine clothing and living as a woman, and he begins to enjoy it.

Production and release

It premiered on April 24, 2010, in the magazine's first issue, and ran until November 25, 2013. The series ended when it did because of the magazine's cancellation with the following issue, and although Suemitsu was happy with the ending, he wondered where the series could have gone had he been able to continue writing it.

When writing the manga, Suemitsu used themes of male gay romance, change, and male femininity, with a focus on how Shuu and the people around him are affected by dressing like women: Shuu goes from being forced to wear women's clothing to doing so willingly, and the cross-dressing is eventually depicted as positive for him. The forced aspect of the cross-dressing was also seen as important due to the slight eroticism it adds.

Ichijinsha has collected the series in three tankōbon volumes, which together with Sazanami Cherry were both the first manga released under the Waai! Comics imprint and the first Waai! manga to see a collected release. The two series were chosen for this as Waai! editor-in-chief Toshinaga Hijikata considered them the most distinctive and representative of their manga. Because of the cross-dressing theme, the magazine staff focused on ensuring that the cover artwork for the collected volumes would not cause embarrassment for potential customers and cause them to avoid bringing a copy to the book store check-out. At some retailers, the collected volumes were bundled with art prints depicting the series' characters wearing their feminine school uniforms and party dresses. The series has also been published in Chinese by Tong Li Publishing starting in 2014.

Volumes

Reception
Reversible! was well received by readers, and Suemitsu still regularly saw royalties for the e-book edition by 2018; he said in 2019 that he frequently received requests for international releases of the series, but that it was up to publishers to determine whether to pursue that. It was also well received by critics: Honcierge called it one of the best manga in its genre, and Bukumaru considered it a "must-read" otokonoko manga.

Neo considered the core conceit of the school-mandated cross-dressing odd but found the manga to stand out from typical cross-dressing manga set in schools, because it avoids having a male cross-dressing character who hides that he is not a woman; instead, it features a setting where cross-dressing is encouraged and even required. They also felt it stood out among manga more generally by replacing the "unattainable girl" manga trope with a gay male romance, while featuring an inexperienced protagonist who is initiated into the societal rules of femininity and living as a woman. Natalie had looked forward to the collected volumes, calling them a "long-awaited" release with appealing cover designs. They found the character artwork cute and also appreciated how the manga stood out; they found that it helped diversify Waai! content and called it the foundation that the magazine rests on, with many other stories being more simplistic and solely revolving around how characters thought to be women are revealed to be cross-dressing men. Bukumaru appreciated its blend of seriousness and comedy and thought that the highlight was to see the main characters grow as people and come to terms with their pasts. Honcierge also enjoyed the comedy and drama and liked the characters, highlighting Aoi's portrayal as an intelligent beauty and how Tsubaki makes for a cute girl while still being able to stand up for himself.

References

External links
  

2010 manga
Cross-dressing in anime and manga
Ichijinsha manga
LGBT in anime and manga
Romance anime and manga
School life in anime and manga
Seinen manga